King of Scandinavia may refer to:

 MS King of Scandinavia, a Danish cruiseferry
 The monarch of one of the Scandinavian countries:
 King of Denmark
 King of Iceland
 King of Norway
 King of Sweden
 A fictional character referred to in A Scandal in Bohemia and The Adventure of the Noble Bachelor, two Sherlock Holmes stories by Arthur Conan Doyle